The Saskatoon Hilltops are a junior Canadian football team based in Saskatoon, Saskatchewan. The Hilltops play in the six-team Prairie Football Conference, which is part of the Canadian Junior Football League (CJFL) and compete annually for the Canadian Bowl. The team was founded in 1921 as a senior team in the Saskatchewan Rugby Football Union, which it played in until 1936. Two years after WWII the team reorganized in 1947. Beginning in 1953, the Hilltops have won 22 Canadian Bowl championships. The Hilltops have won six consecutive Canadian Bowls, having done so between 2014 and 2019.

Playing field

The Hilltops play their home games on the Saskatoon Minor Football Field at Gordie Howe Sports Complex, and practice at Kilburn Park in the  Buena Vista neighbourhood.

Recent history

2014 season
The Hilltops entered the playoffs with 6 wins and 2 losses which resulted in a first place standing. On October 19, 2014 their first play off game against the Winnipeg Rifles was finalized with a 43 to 13 score in favour of the Hilltops. 

The Hilltops proceeded to the Prairie Football Conference finals on Sunday October 26, 2014, defeating the Calgary Colts 27–7 at Saskatoon Minor Football Field. On Nov 8, 2014 the Hilltops completed their successful playoff run with a victory over the Langley Rams at MacLeod Stadium with a final score of 39–14. This was the first of six consecutive Canadian Bowls.

2017 & 2018 record-breaking seasons

The Hilltops entered the 2017 season having completed their third "threepeat": the first being three consecutive Canadian Bowl Championships in 2001, 2002 and 2003; the second 2010, 2011 and 2012; and the most recent 2014, 2015 and 2016. Only three other teams in Canadian Bowl history had the opportunity to win four championships in a row: the Regina Rams (1993, 1994 and 1995); the Edmonton Huskies (1962, 1963 and 1964); and the Montreal AAAs (1925, 1926 and 1927). The Hilltops only loss during the 2017 season came mid-season, in the last two minutes 29-26 at the hands of the Regina Thunder. Their final regular season win over the undefeated Edmonton Huskies earned the Hilltops a matching 7–1 record, but the head-to-head victory gave the Hilltops first place in the PFC and home field advantage for three consecutive playoff games. 

The Hilltops defeated the Winnipeg Rifles and the Regina Thunder before managing a convincing 48–0 win over the Vancouver Island Raiders to make it to their fourth consecutive Canadian Bowl, which was played on Nov 11th in Windsor against the Windsor AKO Fratmen, the oldest CJFL team in continuous operation. The Hilltops emerged victorious in this historic game, winning 56-11, finally achieving the "fourpeat".

The Hilltops completed the 2018 regular season with a perfect 8-0 record scoring 402 points while yielding only 70. Throughout the entire regular season the Hilltops trailed only once, in the fifth game 17-16 to the Regina Thunder with 2:28 left in the first half, regaining the lead before the half ended, and going on to a 48-24 victory. In the playoffs, the Hilltops silenced the Winnipeg Rifles 58-5 and defeated the Edmonton Huskies 28-9. 

The 111th Canadian Bowl championship game was played in Saskatoon on November 17th, between the Hilltops and the British Columbia Football Conference Champion Langley Rams. The Hilltops led from start to finish with a balanced passing and running attack, winning 58-21. The Hilltops finished the season with a perfect 11-0 record, outscoring the opposing teams 546-105; and Head Coach Tom Sargeant also claimed his 12th Canadian Bowl championship.

2019 season
The Hilltops finished the season with a perfect 12-0 record, defeating the Langley Rams 11-6 in a hard fought defensive struggle for the Canadian Bowl at MacLeod Stadium in Langley. In getting to the championship game they beat the London Beefeaters 51-1 in the Interprovincial playoff, the Edmonton Huskies 30 - 14 in the Prairie Conference Final, and the Edmonton Wildcats 31 - 7 in the semi-final. The Toppers finished the regular season with a perfect record, but had to mount 4th quarter comebacks against the Edmonton Huskies and the Regina Thunder. At the end of the 2019 season 15 players graduated from the Hilltops,  among them ten PFC all-stars, five of whom were named CJFL all-stars. Two Hilltops won CJFL Outstanding Player Awards.

Canadian Junior Football League Championships
The Hilltops have won 22 of the 25 Canadian Junior Football Championship Games they have played in, the most recent being the 2019 Canadian Bowl versus the Langley Rams. Throughout the 2017, 2018 and 2019 seasons combined, the Hilltops lost only one game, in mid-season of 2017. Finishing their 2019 season at 12-0, the Hilltops completed their fifth perfect season in team history, going 11-0 in 2018, 12-0 in 2003, 12-0 in 1978 and 11-0 in 1958. They won eight Canadian Bowls during the 2010s.

Canadian Bowl Championships

Armadale Cup Championships

Leader-Post Trophy Championships

Executive committee members and directors

Coaching staff

References

External links
Official website
Canadian Junior Football League

Canadian Junior Football League teams
Sport in Saskatoon
Canadian football teams in Saskatchewan
Sports clubs established in 1947
1947 establishments in Saskatchewan